The 1986 Roller Hockey World Cup was the twenty-seventh roller hockey world cup, organized by the Fédération Internationale de Roller Sports. It was contested by 10 national teams (5 from Europe, 3 from South America, 1 from North America and 1 from Africa). All the games were played in the city of Sertãozinho, in Brazil, the chosen city to host the World Cup.

Results

Standings

See also
 FIRS Roller Hockey World Cup

External links
 1986 World Cup in rink-hockey.net historical database

Roller Hockey World Cup
International roller hockey competitions hosted by Brazil
1986 in roller hockey
1986 in Brazilian sport